Dźwierzuty  is a village in Szczytno County, Warmian-Masurian Voivodeship, in northern Poland. It is the seat of the gmina (administrative district) called Gmina Dźwierzuty.

In 2006 the village had a population of 1,380.

References

Villages in Szczytno County